Manamecchida Hudugi is a 1987 Indian Kannada film directed by M. S. Rajashekar starring Shiva Rajkumar, Sudharani and Sundar Krishna Urs in the lead roles. The film was produced by S. A. Chinne Gowda and S. A. Srinivas in the banner of Kathyayini Cine Art Combines.
Chi. Udaya Shankar penned the dialogues and wrote the screenplay. The film has musical score by Upendra Kumar.
 The film was based on the novel Bete by Kum. Veerabhadrappa.The film was remade in Tamil as Annakili Sonna Kathai (1989) with Sudharani reprising her role.

Cast 

 Dr. Shiva Rajkumar
 Sudharani
 Sundar Krishna Urs
 Shubha
 N. N. Simha
 Balaraj
 Honnavalli Krishna
 Bhatti Mahadevappa
 Shivaprakash
 Papamma

Soundtrack 
"Halligella Ivane Chenda" - S. Janaki
"Keli Ella Keli" - S.P.Balasubramanyam
"Gowramma Ninna Ganda" - S.P.Balasubramanyam, S. Janaki
"Ninnane naanu Benkiyallu Thampu Kandenu" - S.P.Balasubramanyam, S. Janaki
"Usire" - S.P.Balasubramanyam
"Gowri Mogavu" - S.P.Balasubramanyam

References

1980s Kannada-language films
1987 films
Films directed by M. S. Rajashekar
Films based on Indian novels
Films scored by Upendra Kumar
Indian romantic drama films
Kannada films remade in other languages
1987 romantic drama films